Kitni Mast Hai Zindagi is an Indian television series which aired on MTV India from 25 October 2004 to 18 May 2005. It was produced by Balaji Telefilms. It starred Karan Singh Grover, Panchi Bora, Barkha Sengupta, Manasi Parekh and Yash Tonk.

Cast
 Panchi Bora as Ananya
 Karan Singh Grover as Arnav
 Barkha Sengupta as Udita
 Manasi Parekh as Jyoti "Jo"
 Praneet Bhat

References

Balaji Telefilms television series
Indian television soap operas
MTV (Indian TV channel) original programming
2004 Indian television series debuts
2005 Indian television series endings